Jürgen Bremer (born 26 September 1940 in Bützow) is an East German retired slalom canoeist who competed from the early 1960s to the early 1970s. He won four medals at the ICF Canoe Slalom World Championships, with three golds (folding K-1: 1963, K-1: 1967, K-1 team: 1967) and a silver (K-1 team: 1971).

Bremer also finished eighth in the K-1 event at the 1972 Summer Olympics in Munich.

References

1940 births
Canoeists at the 1972 Summer Olympics
German male canoeists
Living people
Olympic canoeists of East Germany
Medalists at the ICF Canoe Slalom World Championships
People from Bützow
Sportspeople from Mecklenburg-Western Pomerania